Christophe Ferreira de Freitas, known as Christophe Freitas (born May 9, 1981 in Ermont) is a French professional football player. Currently, he plays in the Championnat de France amateur for FC Martigues.

He played on the professional level in Ligue 2 for Le Mans Union Club 72, before playing in the Championnat National with L'Entente SSG and SO Châtellerault.

References

1981 births
Living people
People from Ermont
French footballers
Ligue 2 players
Le Mans FC players
FC Martigues players
Entente SSG players
SO Châtellerault players
Association football midfielders
Footballers from Val-d'Oise